Nuria Párrizas Díaz was the defending champion but chose to participate at the 2022 French Open instead.

Elisabetta Cocciaretto won the title, defeating Ylena In-Albon in the final, 6–2, 6–2.

Seeds

Draw

Finals

Top half

Bottom half

References

Main Draw

Città di Grado Tennis Cup - Singles